Nuthall is a village and civil parish located in Nottinghamshire, England, neighbouring Kimberley, Watnall, Cinderhill and Basford. The population of the civil parish at the 2011 census was 6,311.
It is part of the borough of Broxtowe.

Nuthall is split into two areas, Old Nuthall, which lies between the Nuthall Island roundabout and Kimberley, and New Nuthall, which lies between Bells Lane and Nuthall Island.  New Nuthall also includes the Mornington Crescent Estate, a late 1980s/early 1990s exclusive development which borders Strelley and the Hempshill Vale estate and occupies the former site of Assarts Farm.  New Nuthall also borders Broxtowe Country Park and a bypass road (Woodhouse Way).

In comparison to New Nuthall, the houses in Old Nuthall tend to be smaller and less spread out. Old Nuthall is focused on the main roads of Nottingham Road, Kimberley Road and Watnall Road.  It also includes the Larkfields estate a council estate with a large proportion of privately owned homes. These council homes are considerably smaller than other homes found in the Mornington Crescent Estate and Old Nuthall.

New Nuthall is largely detached 1960s/1970s houses situated on the Cedarlands/Horsendale estate.  New Nuthall also includes the suburban housing estate known as Mornington/Assarts Farm.  The estate has a popular school, a doctors surgery, and shop complex as well as a pub/restaurant, an Indian restaurant, making the estate largely self-contained.

Nuthall Temple (now demolished) was the stately home of the Holden family. Papers of the Holden family are held at the department of Manuscripts and Special Collections, The University of Nottingham.

The parish church is dedicated to St Patrick.

Captain Ronald Thomas Shepherd, of Highfield Road, Nuthall was awarded the OBE for his wartime services as chief test pilot for Rolls-Royce. He also made the first free flight of the Rolls-Royce Thrust Measuring Rig, nicknamed the Flying Bedstead at Hucknall Aerodrome. He died a few months later, 1 March 1955 and is buried in the New Farm Lane cemetery Nuthall, in the only grave which faces north - towards Hucknall airfield.

References

External links

Villages in Nottinghamshire
Places in the Borough of Broxtowe
Civil parishes in Nottinghamshire